John Eklund (born 21 September 1993) is a Swedish freestyle skier. He competed in ski cross at the World Ski Championships 2013, and at the 2014 Winter Olympics in Sochi, in ski-cross.

References

1993 births
Living people
Freestyle skiers at the 2014 Winter Olympics
Swedish male freestyle skiers
Olympic freestyle skiers of Sweden
21st-century Swedish people